Winona & St. Peter R. Co. v. Barney, 113 U.S. 618 (1885),  was a case in brought to the United States Supreme Court involving public land grants to a state to aid in constructing railroads which contained a description which would be difficult to give full effect if used in an instrument of private conveyance. 

By the Act of March 3, 1857, the United States Congress granted to the then Territory of Minnesota, in aid of the construction of certain railroads, certain alternate sections of lands along the lines of the roads, and further provided:

The reservation of the lands previously granted to Minnesota from the grant of the additional four sections—that is, from the extension of the original grant of 1857—was only a legislative declaration of that which the law would have pronounced independently of it. Previous grants of the same property would necessarily be excluded from subsequent ones. The only embarrassment in the construction of the section arises from the inapt words used to describe the land from which the previous grant is to be deducted. The language of the section is

The only lands granted by the act of 1865 were the four sections for each mile additional to the original six, accompanied with a right to select indemnity lands within twenty miles of the road. The words "the full quantity granted" only denote the entire extension. To the extent of the previous grant that extension must be reduced, even if the whole be taken. Those words did not transfer the loss from the ten sections within which the grant falls to other sections along the line. The sections in which such grant falls are correspondingly reduced.

It followed that where the grant previously made to Minnesota to aid in the construction of the Minnesota and Cedar Valley Railroad interferes with the extension of the grant to the defendant by the act of 1865, the extension must be abandoned. The earlier grant takes the land which would otherwise be added to the original six sections. The court below therefore erred in holding that the Winona and St. Peter Railroad was entitled to ten full sections where such interference occurred, without deducting the lands previously granted to the state. The cause must therefore go back that the proper deduction may be made by reason of this interference of the two grants, and the elder grant be deducted from the extension made by the act of 1865.

The decree was reversed and the cause remanded with directions to take further proceedings in accordance with this opinion.

See also
List of United States Supreme Court cases, volume 113
Winona and St. Peter Railroad

References

External links
 

United States Supreme Court cases
United States Supreme Court cases of the Waite Court
1885 in United States case law
Railway litigation in 1885
Chicago and North Western Railway